Trinity Western University v British Columbia College of Teachers, [2001] 1 S.C.R. 772, 2001 SCC 31, is a leading Supreme Court of Canada decision on the freedom of religion and the court's ability to review a private school's policies.

Background
Trinity Western University is a private Christian university that sought to take full responsibility for an existing teacher education program jointly run by Trinity Western and Simon Fraser University. The school applied to the British Columbia College of Teachers for the proper certification. 

The College rejected Trinity Western's application on the grounds that the school's community standards policy, which applied to all students, faculty, and staff, prohibited "homosexual behaviour". The College argued that this policy was discriminatory and that it would not be in the public interest to approve the application.

Opinion of the Court
In an eight to one decision, the Court held that the College "acted unfairly" in rejecting Trinity Western's application. The Court concurred with the lower provincial courts, stating that "[i]n considering the religious precepts of TWU instead of the actual impact of these beliefs on the public school environment, the BCCT acted on the basis of irrelevant considerations."

The Court further observed that "[t]here is nothing in the TWU Community Standards, which are limited to prescribing conduct of members while at TWU, that indicates that graduates of TWU will not treat homosexuals fairly and respectfully.  The evidence to date is that graduates from the joint TWU-SFU teacher education program have become competent public school teachers, and there is no evidence before this Court of discriminatory conduct."

See also
List of Supreme Court of Canada cases (McLachlin Court) 
Multani v. Commission scolaire Marguerite‑Bourgeoys

References

External links
 
 The Supreme Court of Canada will hear the Trinity Western University Teacher Certification Challenge November 9 news release from Trinity Western University
 Intervener factum of the Christian Legal Fellowship
 Intervener factum of the BC Civil Liberties Association

Canadian freedom of religion case law
Supreme Court of Canada cases
Trinity Western University
2001 in Canadian case law
Education in Canada
Anti-discrimination law in Canada
Canadian LGBT rights case law